The Man of Sorrows is an 1891 oil painting by the Flemish expressionist painter James Ensor. This painting is enlisted on the official inventories of Flemish masterpieces and is a  part of the great masters collection of the Royal Museum of Fine Arts Antwerp.

This painting is based on a fifteenth-century painting by Albert Bouts that has the same title.

Ensor's use of the visual elements of a demon in The Man of Sorrows and generally in his religious paintings is significant.

Description
The bleeding face of Christ in combination with a devil's mask from the Japanese Noh theatre creates a horrifying combination.

Ensor's use of sharp colours add to the grotesque atmosphere of the painting.

Interpretation
The Man of Sorrows is the manifestation of Ensor's identification with Christ who was also a marginal and misunderstood person. The tortured expression on the face of Christ also reflects the existential crisis that the artist went through in 1890s. During this period of his life, Ensor was deeply depressed. As a result of his depression, he tried to sell his studio and its entire contents of pictures.

Representing himself deformed and in pain with a bleeding face reflects the artist's suffering and his interpretation of literal affliction.

Source of inspiration
The artist's frustration with the conformist society of his time surged in 1891. The Man of Sorrows is a turning point in Ensor's career and it shows the artist's anger and his desire for resistance.

Ensor was intrigued by Bruegel and the primitive. He called his fascination as "love for extraordinary and the abnormal". This love is reflected in The Man of Sorrows and another of his paintings, The Mystic Death of a Theologian.

References

External links
 The official website of vlaamsekunstcollectie. Retrieved 26 February 2020
 Official website of KMSKA, The Royal Museum of Antwerp. Retrieved 26 February 2020
 Official website of standaard. Retrieved 26 February 2020

1891 paintings 
Paintings by James Ensor
Paintings in the collection of the Royal Museum of Fine Arts Antwerp 
Belgian art 
Paintings depicting Jesus